Bhai Jaan  is a 1945 Bollywood film. It was released on 15 September 1945 in Bombay. Directed by Syed Khalil. The actors were Karan Dewan, Noor Jehan, Anees Khatoon, Meena Shorey, Shah Nawaz, Ansari and Nazir. It was a family drama, made under the banner of United Films. The print has been lost now.

The film a Muslim social family drama, is about two brothers (Shah Nawaz and Karan Dewan) in love with a dancing girl (Noor Jehan), which disrupts their family life. It leads to the girl consuming poison in order to maintain the respectability of the brothers' family name.

Cast
 Karan Dewan
 Noor Jehan
 Anees Khatoon
 Meena Shorey
 Shah Nawaz
 Ansari
 Nazir

Soundtrack
The music director was Shyamsunder with lyrics by Partau Lakhnavi. The singers were Noor Jehan, Zeenat Begum and had Shiv Dayal Batish for "Aa Hosh Mein Aa".

Songlist

References

External links
 Bhaijaan meaning in English 

1945 films
1940s Hindi-language films
1940s Urdu-language films
Indian black-and-white films
Urdu-language Indian films